Lucia Dlugoszewski (June 16, 1925 – April 11, 2000) was a Polish-American composer, poet, choreographer, performer, and inventor. She created over a hundred musical instruments, including the timbre piano, a sort of prepared piano in which hammers and keys were replaced with bows and plectra.

Background and early years

The daughter of Polish immigrants, Dlugoszewski was born and raised in Detroit. Beginning at the age of six, she studied piano under Agelageth Morrison at the Detroit Institute of Musical Arts, also known as the Detroit Conservatory of Music. Later in life, she studied pre-med at Wayne State University, where she also took physics courses.

Surprised and disappointed by an unsuccessful application to medical school in 1950, Dlugoszewski spontaneously moved to New York City, where she would spend the rest of her life. In New York, Dlugoszewski took piano lessons from Grete Sultan and studied analysis with Felix Salzer and composition with Edgard Varèse. 

Apart from a handful of piano preludes and sonatas, Dlugoszewski had written little music prior to 1950, but once in New York, she quickly became a prolific composer of experimental music, including several open-form works. Dlugoszewski was married to dancer and choreographer Erick Hawkins until his death in 1994.

Compositions
Dlugoszewski's compositions have been recorded for Nonesuch Records, Folkways, CRI, and other important contemporary music labels. Her 1975 piece Abyss and Caress, for trumpet and small orchestra, was commissioned by the New York Philharmonic and premièred by Pierre Boulez. In 1977, she became the first woman to win the Koussevitzky International Recording Award with Fire Fragile Flight, for 17 instruments – the work became a signature piece for the Philadelphia ensemble Orchestra of Our Time. The recordings for Nonesuch and CRI released in the 70s were reissued by CRI in 2002 as Disparate Stairway Radical Other along with new work for string quartet and timbre piano.

Beginning in 1957, Dlugoszewski cultivated a professional and personal relationship with the dancer and choreographer Erick Hawkins. Dlugoszewski, a dancer herself, wrote chamber and orchestral scores for the Erick Hawkins Dance Ensemble as well as for the Foundation for Modern Dance. Her music for dance includes Journey of a Poet, written for and executed by Mikhail Baryshnikov, and Taking Time to be Vulnerable, for Pascal Denichou. She also contributed music for chamber ensemble to the soundtrack of the 1962 avant-garde film Guns of the Trees, directed by Jonas Mekas. A very early performance of her timbre piano can be heard in her music for Marie Menken's 1945 film Visual Variations on Noguchi, a score perhaps added later in the early 50s when the composer had arrived in New York.

During a conversation with Cole Gagne in the early 1990s, Dlugoszewski expressed ambivalence at having composed so many collaborative pieces, pointing out that while writing for film and dance allowed her music to be heard by enormous numbers of listeners, those audiences could not give her music their undivided attention.

Dlugoszewski composed dozens of pieces for a variety of instruments and ensembles; below is a small selection of her total works.

Inventions

Like that of Pauline Oliveros, Harry Partch and Moondog, Dlugoszewski's music was animated by the invention and construction of new musical instruments, many of which she utilized in performance. In her interview with Gagne, the composer estimated that she had constructed or designed at least a hundred instruments during her career (a frequent partner was sculptor Ralph Dorazio, who built instruments to Dlugoszewski's specifications). 

She was inspired, she told Gagne, by her teacher Varèse, who used electronic tools to create disorienting and exciting new sonorities. "It's not that I was out to invent instruments", said Dlugoszewski, "but that I wanted to create an ego-less sound possibility, a suchness possibility, so that you would help the ear just to hear the sound for its own sake."

Most of Dlugoszewski's invented instruments are percussive: pianos, drums, rattles and gourds. She created dozens of new instruments, many made of plastic, for a single 1961 work, Eight Clear Places. Her most famous invented instrument is the timbre piano, which uses bows and plectra in addition to the traditional keys.

Dlugoszewski retreated from invention after the early 1960s, preferring to explore the possibilities of the huge array of instruments which she by then had at her disposal.

Philosophy
Dlugoszewski, like other composers of her generation, claimed a wide and varied assortment of influences, many of them Eastern in origin (Noh drama and haiku, for example). She was exceptional, though, for her belief in the power of subtlety in music. Virgil Thomson described hers as "music of great delicacy". Dlugoszewski's music is remarkable for its use of silence and of gentle, muffled sounds, especially considering that much of her repertoire is for percussion instruments.

References

Notes

External links
Erick Hawkins and Lucia Dlugoszewski Papers at the Library of Congress
Obituary of Lucia Dlugoszewski, The New York Times

1925 births
2000 deaths
American women classical composers
American classical composers
Musicians from Detroit
Wayne State University alumni
American people of Polish descent
20th-century classical composers
20th-century American women musicians
20th-century American composers
Classical musicians from Michigan
20th-century women composers